Bat Meets Blaine is the debut full-length collaboration between Chicago-based rapper Qwazaar, of the group Typical Cats, and Berlin-based producer Batsauce. The album was released on September 13, 2011, on Galapagos4. It is the follow-up to their debut EP Style Be the King, released the previous July.

Track listing
"A Choice" - 1:37
"I Know" - 2:37
"What Love" - 2:54
"Chop 'Em Down" - 2:28
"Eye to the Sky" - 3:04
"Never Weaker" - 4:20 (featuring Onry Ozzborn & Offwhyte)
"Surrealism" - 2:52 (featuring Lady Daisey)
"Power" - 2:36
"If It Seems Wrong" - 2:51
"I'm Gone" - 2:47
"A Feeling" - 4:11 (featuring Denizen Kane & KP the Illustrado)
"The Dream" - 2:39
"'Til It's Done" - 2:45
"Thank You" - 3:53

References

2011 albums
Collaborative albums